Bili Hendthi is a 1975 Kannada movie, directed by Puttanna Kanagal, starring Aarathi, Loknath and Margaret Thomsen.

Plot 
Sharada (Arathi) who is affianced to a guy studying abroad, is extremely close with her future in-laws. However, when her fiancé returns, she finds out that he has married Elisa, a "white woman", and is no longer interested in her. Sharada assumes a larger-than-life good-Samaritan character, presumably the antithesis of a jilted lover, she becomes best friends with the 'white woman'. Elisa, on her part, wins over her family with her agreeable character and willingness to integrate into Indian society. Until she finds out that her husband has betrayed Sharada's love.

Cast 
 Aarathi as Sharada
 Lokanath as Sharada's father
 Leelavathi as Gopinath's mother
 Margaret Thomsen as Elisa/Lalitha
 Anil Kumar as Gopinath
 Uma Shivakumar as Sharada's mother 
Seetharam as Gopinath's father

Soundtrack
The music of the film was composed by Vijaya Bhaskar, with lyrics penned by Vijaya Narasimha.

References

External links 
 

1975 films
1970s Kannada-language films
Films directed by Puttanna Kanagal
Films scored by Vijaya Bhaskar